An arclight or arc lamp is a lamp that produces a bright light by generating an electric arc across two electrodes.

Arclight, Arc Light or arc light may also refer to:

Arts and entertainment

Characters
 Arclight (comics), a mutant super-villain character from Marvel Comics
 Arclight (DC Comics), a super-villain character from DC Comics
 Arclight family, characters from the Yu-Gi-Oh! Zexal
 Jackson Dane (codename Arclight), a member of the Team 7 superheros from Wildstorm Comics

Music
 Arc Light (album), a 2009 album by Lau
 Arclight (album), a 2016 album by Julian Lage
 Arclight, the third album by Swedish rock band Silverbullit
 "Arclight", a song by VNV Nation, from the album Empires
 "Arclight", a song by Deathstars, from the album Night Electric Night
 "Arclight", a song by Exhumed from the album Anatomy Is Destiny, 2003

Theaters
 ArcLight Hollywood, a cinema complex in Hollywood, California
 ArcLight Sherman Oaks, a cinema complex in Sherman Oaks, California

Other arts and entertainment
 Arc Light (novel), a 1994 techno-thriller novel by Eric Harry
 Arc Light (film), 1988 Chinese film
 Arclight (novel), a novel series by Josin L. McQuein

Military
 ArcLight (missile), a development program of the Defense Advanced Research Projects Agency to develop a replacement for the Tomahawk missile
 Operation Arc Light, the 1965 deployment of B-52 Stratofortress bombers to Guam

Other uses
 ArcLight (biology), a genetically-encoded voltage indicator
 Arclight Fabrication, an Aaron Kaufman owned business